Alfter is a municipality in the Rhein-Sieg district, in North Rhine-Westphalia, Germany. It is situated approximately 6 km west of Bonn.

Location
The community of Alfter lies west of former capital of Bonn, on the southern ridge of the "Vorgebirge". It borders on the city of Bornheim to the north, Bonn to the east, the cities of Meckenheim and Rheinbach to the south and the community of Swisttal to the west. Alfter consists of a total area of 35 km², of which 18 km² is used for agricultural purposes and 8 km² is forest.

References

Rhein-Sieg-Kreis